General Pedernera is a department of San Luis Province, Argentina.

With an area of  it borders to the north with the department of Coronel Pringles and Chacabuco, to the east with Córdoba Province, to the south with Gobernador Dupuy and to the west with Juan Martín de Pueyrredón.

Its name pays homage to Lieutenant-general Juan Esteban Pedernera who fought with the Regiment of Mounted Grenadiers during the Argentine War of Independence and became the interim president of the Argentine Confederation.

On October 14, 2009, the government of San Luis passed the decree of need and urgency No. 2884 MGJyC 09, which created the municipality of the Ranquel people-nation in 66.000 hectares of the General Pedernera Department, so as to provide a settlement for members of the Ranquel native people. In addition, a delegate was designed to manage the municipality, organized according to the traditions and customs of the Ranquel people.       

According to the 2010 national census, there are 125.470 inhabitants in the department.

Municipalities 
 Juan Jorba
 Juan Llerena
 Justo Daract
 La Punilla
 Lavaisse
 San José del Morro
 Villa Mercedes
 Villa Reynolds
 Villa Salles

Villages 
 Caldenadas
 Chalanta
 Coronel Alzogaray
 Crámer
 El Centenario
 El Durazno
 Gloria de Dios
 La Aguada
 La Angelina
 La Esquina
 La Portada
 Las Isletas
 Las Vizcacheras
 Liborio Luna
 Pedernera
 Pioneros Siglo XXI
 Río Quinto
 Soven
 Travesía

References

External links 
 Provincial website

Departments of San Luis Province